"Stranger on the Shore of Love" is a hit single written and performed by American R&B singer-songwriter Stevie Wonder on the Tamla (Motown) label from his 1985 album In Square Circle.

Personnel 
 Stevie Wonder – lead vocal, background vocal, synthesizers, drums, harpsichord, accordion

Charts

References 

1985 songs
1986 singles
Stevie Wonder songs
Songs written by Stevie Wonder